Malvinas Islands are located south of Puerto Sánchez in the General Carrera Lake, Aisén Region of Chile.

See also
 Puerto Ingeniero Ibáñez
 List of islands of Chile

External links
 Recopilación de Reglamentos, Contraloría General de la República de Chile, 1970
 Yoshihiko  AKAGI, Landforms around the Lago General Carrera

Islands of Aysén Region
Lake islands of Chile